Alder Hills is a suburb in Dorset that crosses the boundaries of Bournemouth and Poole. It is south of Wallisdown, east of Alderney and north of Parkstone.

History 
In July 2019, a huge heathland fire occurred in the area. It was reported that it could take 20 years to recover after fire. In August 2020 there was another fire.

Environment 
The Alder Hills Nature Reserve is in the area. The reserve is noted for its lizard and dragonfly populations. In 1984 it was designated as a Site of Special Scientific Interest by Natural England.

Facilities 

Alder Hills is served by the Heatherview Medical Centre.

Politics 
Alder Hills falls within two constituencies.  Part is within the Poole Constituency, and is served by the Conservative politician, Sir Robert Syms MP.  The other part is within the Bournemouth West constituency and served by Conor Burns MP.

References 

Areas of Bournemouth
Areas of Poole
Sites of Special Scientific Interest in Dorset
Heaths of the United Kingdom